Viktor (Vihtori) Viitanen (18 November 1863, Honkilahti - 1918) was a Finnish prison officer and politician. He was a member of the Parliament of Finland from 1907 to 1908, representing the Social Democratic Party of Finland (SDP).

References

1863 births
1918 deaths
People from Eura
People from Turku and Pori Province (Grand Duchy of Finland)
Social Democratic Party of Finland politicians
Members of the Parliament of Finland (1907–08)
Prison officers